Socratis Hasikos (12 April 1956 – 5 April 2021) was a Cypriot politician. He was the Minister of the Interior (2013–17) and Minister of the Defence (1999–2003, 2014).

Hasikos was born in Nicosia on 12 April 1956. He grew up in the village of Dikomo in Kyrenia District. He studied law at the National and Kapodistrian University of Athens.
Hasikos’ wife, Elli Koulermou, died of cancer in 2019 aged 54. He is survived by two sons and a daughter.

References

1956 births
2021 deaths
Greek Cypriot people
Cyprus Ministers of Defence
Cyprus Ministers of the Interior
Members of the House of Representatives (Cyprus)
National and Kapodistrian University of Athens alumni
People from Nicosia
People from Kyrenia District